"Animal Instincts" is an episode of the BBC sitcom, The Green Green Grass. It was screened on 29 January 2009, as the fourth episode of the fourth series.

Synopsis

Oakam village is under attack from animal rights activists. Llewellyn is one of their first targets when he is hit with a paint bomb, the village butcher is fly-postered with leaflets and even the local pub is under threat. All the local farming community is living in fear, so Boycie organises his staff into patrol groups to search Winderdown farm and protect it from attack.

Episode cast

Production, broadcast and reception

Broadcast
This episode entertained 3.87 million viewers.

Writer and cast
This episode was written by Jim Sullivan, his second episode of series four.

Notes
 The end credits were played by Status Quo.

References

British TV Comedy Guide for The Green Green Grass
BARB viewing figures

2009 British television episodes
The Green Green Grass episodes